Sripurandan (North) is a village in the Udayarpalayam taluk of Ariyalur district, Tamil Nadu, India.

Demographics 

As per the 2001 census, Sripurandan (North) had a total population of 3029 with 1523 males and 1506 females.

Stolen Idols
The village became famous in 2008, when theft of 8 idols were discovered from a 9th-century Chola temple was discovered by Government of India officials. One of these idols, the Sripuranthan Natarajan Idol found its way to the National Gallery of Australia. Two of the stolen statues were consequently returned and are now displayed in the Government Museum at Kumbakonam.

References 

Villages in Ariyalur district